The 1898 Ontario general election was the ninth general election held in the Province of Ontario, Canada.  It was held on March 1, 1898, to elect the 94 Members of the 9th Legislative Assembly of Ontario ("MLAs").

The Ontario Liberal Party, led by Arthur S. Hardy, won an eighth term in office with a clear majority – the Patrons of Industry and the Protestant Protective Association held no sway in this legislature.

The Ontario Conservative Party, led by Sir James P. Whitney, formed the official opposition.

Results

|-
! colspan=2 rowspan=2 | Political party
! rowspan=2 | Party leader
! colspan=5 | MPPs
! colspan=3 | Votes
|-
! Candidates
!1894
!Dissol.
!1898
!±
!#
!%
! ± (pp)

|style="text-align:left;"|Arthur S. Hardy
|91
|45
|
|51
|6
|202,332
|47.29%
|6.30

|style="text-align:left;"|James P. Whitney
|90
|23
|
|42
|19
|204,011
|47.69%
|19.88

|style="text-align:left;"|
|1
|–
|
|1
|1
|1,740
|0.41%
|

|style="text-align:left;"|Liberal-Patrons
|style="text-align:left;"|
|–
|12
|
|–
|12
|rowspan="7" colspan="3"|Did not campaign

|style="text-align:left;"|Conservative–P.P.A.
|style="text-align:left;"|
|–
|5
|
|–
|5

|style="text-align:left;"|Joseph Longford Haycock
|–
|3
|
|–
|3

|style="text-align:left;"|Conservative-Patrons
|style="text-align:left;"|
|–
|2
|
|–
|2

|style="text-align:left;"|Liberal-P.P.A.
|style="text-align:left;"|
|–
|2
|
|–
|2
|-
|style="background-color:#FF8000;"|
|style="text-align:left;"|Protestant Protective Association
|style="text-align:left;"|
|–
|1
|
|–
|1

|style="text-align:left;"|
|–
|1
|
|–
|1

|style="text-align:left;"|
|18
|–
|–
|–
|
|19,683
|4.60%
|2.10

|style="text-align:left;"|
|1
|–
|–
|–
|
|57
|0.01%
|

|colspan="3"|
|
|colspan="5"|
|-style="background:#E9E9E9;"
|colspan="3" style="text-align:left;"|Total
|201
|94
|94
|94
|
|427,823
|100.00%
|
|-
|colspan="8" style="text-align:left;"|Blank and invalid ballots
|align="right"|3,601
|style="background:#E9E9E9;" colspan="2"|
|-style="background:#E9E9E9;"
|colspan="8" style="text-align:left;"|Registered voters / turnout
|525,795
|82.05%
|11.75
|}

Seats that changed hands

There were 50 seats that changed allegiance in the election:

 Conservative to Liberal
Algoma West
Haldimand
Halton
Kingston
Lanark North
Lennox
London
Northumberland East
Perth North
York West

Liberal/Patrons of Industry to Liberal
Bruce Centre
Hastings East
Kent West
Middlesex North
Parry Sound
Perth South

Conservative/PPA to Liberal
Lambton West
Muskoka

Liberal/PPA to Liberal
Bruce North

Independent-Conservative/PPA to Liberal
 Lambton East

Liberal to Conservative
Grey North
Hamilton East
Hamilton West
Hastings West
Huron South
Ontario North
Ontario South
Ottawa (1 MLA)
Renfrew North
Simcoe Centre
Victoria West
Waterloo North
Waterloo South
Wentworth North

Liberal/Patrons of Industry to Conservative
Elgin West
Frontenac
Glengarry
Prince Edward
Simcoe West
Stormont

Conservative/PPA to Conservative
Durham West
Toronto East
Wellington West

Patrons of Industry to Conservative
Dufferin
Grey South
Hastings North

Conservative/Patrons of Industry to Conservative
Cardwell

Liberal/PPA to Conservative
Middlesex East

PPA to Conservative
Grey Centre

Conservative/Patrons of Industry to Independent-Conservative
Carleton

MLAs changing parties
Six members changed their principal affiliation from the previous election:

See also

Politics of Ontario
List of Ontario political parties
Premier of Ontario
Leader of the Opposition (Ontario)

References

1898
1898 elections in Canada
1898 in Ontario
March 1898 events